Janne Juutinen (born February 15, 1994) is a Finnish ice hockey player. He is currently playing with HIFK in the Finnish Liiga.

Juutinen made his Liiga debut playing with HIFK during the 2013–14 Liiga season.

References

External links

1994 births
Living people
Finnish ice hockey forwards
HIFK (ice hockey) players
People from Hyvinkää
Sportspeople from Uusimaa